is a city in Hyōgo Prefecture, Japan. , the city had an estimated population of 35,639 in 14694 households and a population density of 110 persons per km².

Geography 
Shisō is located in the midwestern part of Hyōgo Prefecture, about 100 kilometers from Kobe and about 30 km from Himeji, bordering Okayama Prefecture in the west and Tottori Prefecture in the north. The city area extends for 32 kilometer east-west and 42 kilometers north-south, and has the second largest area in the prefecture after Toyooka, but the population density is low because most of the city area is mountainous. The main rivers are the Ibo River and the Chikusa River. The Ibo River flows south to Himeji.

Neighbouring municipalities 
Hyōgo Prefecture
 Asago
 Himeji
 Kamikawa
 Sayō
 Tatsuno
 Yabu
Okayama Prefecture
 Nishiawakura
Tottori Prefecture
 Wakasa

Climate
Shisō has a humid subtropical climate (Köppen climate classification Cfa) with hot summers and cool to cold winters. Precipitation is significantly higher in summer than in winter, though on the whole lower than most parts of Honshū, and there is no significant snowfall.

Demographics
Per Japanese census data, the population of Shisō in 2020 is 34,819 people. Shisō has been conducting censuses since 1920.

History
The area of Shisō was part of ancient Harima Province and the Yamasaki neighborhood of the city developed as a node between the ancient  San'yōdō and San'indō and the Inaba Kaidō highways. The area was also known for its production of tatara steel, often used in the production of Japanese swords. The presence of Iwa Shrine, the ichinomiya of Harima Province indicates that this was the ancient center of Harima. During the Edo Period, Yamasaki Domain under a cadet branch of the Honda clan ruled a portion of the territory. In 1871, following the Meiji restoration, the area became part of Shisō District, Hyōgo and the town of  Yamasaki was established with the creation of the modern municipalities system. The city of Shisō was established on April 1, 2005, from the merger of the four towns of Shisō District: Chikusa, Haga, Ichinomiya, and Yamasaki.

Government
Shisō has a mayor-council form of government with a directly elected mayor and a unicameral city council of 16 members. Shisō contributes one member to the Hyogo Prefectural Assembly. In terms of national politics, the city is part of Hyōgo 12th district of the lower house of the Diet of Japan.

Economy
Shisō has mostly a rural economy based on forestry and agriculture.

Education
Shisō has twelve public elementary schools and seven public middle schools operated by the city government and three public high schools operated by the Hyōgo Prefectural Department of Education. There is also one private high school.

Transportation

Railway 
Shisō does not have any passenger railway services.

Highways 
  Chūgoku Expressway

Sister cities 
  (Sequim, Washington), since November 4, 2005

Gallery

Local attractions 
 Iwa Shrine, the ichinomiya of former Harima Province
 Banshu Yamasaki Iris Garden

References

External links

  

Cities in Hyōgo Prefecture
Shisō, Hyōgo